Saba Andreyevich Sazonov (born 1 February 2002) is a football player who plays as a centre back for Russian Premier League club Dynamo Moscow. Born in Russia, he plays for the Georgia national team.

Early life
His mother Nino Nishnianidze is a former professional Georgian volleyball player from Samtredia. She moved to Saint Petersburg where she met her Russian husband. During his childhood, Sazonov moved to Georgia and then back to Russia, to feel more comfortable with both countries' language and culture.

Club career
He made his debut in the Russian Premier League for FC Zenit Saint Petersburg on 16 May 2021 in a game against FC Tambov. He substituted Magomed Ozdoyev in the 76th minute.

In June 2021, he joined FC Dynamo Moscow on tryout. On 9 July 2021, he signed a three-year contract with Dynamo.

International career
In September 2022, Sazonov was called up to the Georgia national under-21 football team. He was also called up to the Russia national under-21 football team for the same dates, but chose to represent Georgia. He debuted with the senior Georgia national team in a friendly 3–0 loss to Morocco on 17 November 2022.

Honours

Club
Zenit Saint Petersburg
Russian Premier League: 2020–21

Career statistics

Club

References

External links
 
 

2002 births
Living people
Footballers from Saint Petersburg
Footballers from Georgia (country)
Georgia (country) international footballers
Georgia (country) under-21 international footballers
Russian footballers
Georgian people of Russian descent
Russian people of Georgian descent
Association football defenders
FC Zenit Saint Petersburg players
FC Dynamo Moscow players
Russian Premier League players
Russian Second League players
FC Zenit-2 Saint Petersburg players